The Complete Anthology is a compilation album by Australian rock band Mondo Rock, released in October 2017 through BloodLine Records / Liberation Music. 
The Complete Anthology includes all the hits, plus album tracks and rarities, from their 1978 debut single "The Fugitive Kind" to 1991's "Soul Reason".

Mondo Rock will tour in support of the album in June 2018.

Track listing 
CD1CD2

Charts

Release history

References 

2017 compilation albums
Mondo Rock albums
Liberation Records albums
Compilation albums by Australian artists
Albums produced by John L Sayers
Albums produced by Ross Wilson